For the song by DeBarge, see Time Will Reveal (song)

Time Will Reveal is the fourth studio album by the American West Coast hip hop group Above the Law. Released in 1996 by Tommy Boy Records, it was the group's first record after leaving Ruthless Records following the death of member Eazy-E. The group's former labelmates Kokane and MC Ren made guest appearances on the record, along with Enuff, Daddy Cool and Kid Frost. Time Will Reveal peaked at number 16 on the Top R&B/Hip-Hop Albums and number 80 on the Billboard 200.

The album was primarily produced by Cold 187um with KM.G and Total K-oss, except for Cold 187 um's remix of "City of Angels" (the original version appeared on the film soundtrack to The Crow: City of Angels), which was produced by Tony G and Julio G. The album's lead single "100 Spokes" peaked at number 24 on the Hot Rap Singles and number 81 on the Hot R&B/Hip-Hop Singles & Tracks.

Track listing

Personnel

Gregory Fernan Hutchinson - vocals, executive producer, producer (tracks 1-13, 15), remixing (track 14), recording
Kevin Michael Gulley - vocals, executive producer, co-producer
Anthony Stewart - vocals, executive producer, co-producer
Jerry Long, Jr. - vocals (tracks 5, 9), backing vocals
Dorinda "DoRe'" Roberts - vocals (tracks 1-2, 8)
Michael Sims - vocals (track 7), bass, guitar
Gee - vocals (tracks 1, 7) 
Enuff - vocals (tracks 5, 9) 
Lorenzo Patterson - vocals (track 7)
Daddy Cool - vocals (track 9) 
Dawnmonique - vocals (track 10) 
Mike Holmes - vocals (track 11)
Arturo Molina, Jr. - vocals (track 14)
Brian Gardner - mastering
Tom Coyne - mastering 
Donovan Smith - mixing, recording
Mark Paladino - mixing, recording
Randal "Lodown" Harris - assistant engineer
Julio Gonzalez - producer (track 14)
Tony Gonzales - producer (track 14)
Ian Steaman - artwork direction 
John Carr - illustrations 
Dean Karr - photography

Charts
Album - Billboard (United States)

Singles - Billboard (United States)

References

1996 albums
Above the Law (group) albums
Albums produced by Cold 187um
Tommy Boy Records albums